Jean-Philippe Ansermet (born ) is a Swiss physicist and engineer and a professor at École Polytechnique Fédérale de Lausanne. His research focuses on the fabrication and properties of nanostructured materials as well as spintronics.

Career 
Jean-Philippe Ansermet graduated with a diploma in physical engineering from École Polytechnique Fédérale de Lausanne in 1980. He then pursued a PhD at the University of Illinois at Urbana-Champaign, developing NMR spectroscopy for catalysis research and defending his thesis in 1985. He then continued his research on surface NMR as a postdoc at the same institution until 1987, when he was named group leader for the Swiss chemical company Ciba-Geigy, working on composite materials and charge-transfer salts. In 1992, he was named professor of experimental physics at EPFL, where he was promoted to full professor in 1995 and named head of the physics section in 2007. There, he teaches classical mechanics as well as thermodynamics to undergraduate and graduate students.

He was a member of the executive committee of the European Physical Society from 1993 to 1998, and the president of the Swiss Physical Society from 2002 to 2006.

Research 
Ansermet heads the Laboratory of the Physics of Nanostructured Materials at the Institute of Physics of EPFL. Research in his lab focuses on spintronics and novel magnetic resonance methods, including sub-THz instrumentation.

The laboratory of Ansermet characterized giant magnetoresistance with current driven perpendicular to the interfaces of Co/Cu multilayers before large collaborations could achieve the same through lithography. It also participated in the discovery that a current can flip the magnetization of a nanostructure via the spin-transfer torque. The lab demonstrated the concept of a heat-driven spin torque in ferromagnetic metals. Using thermodynamics, the laboratory also predicted and demonstrated a heat-driven spin torque in insulating ferromagnet.

The laboratory of Ansermet studies Dynamic Nuclear Polarization (DNP) as a way to enhance signals in surface-NMR experiments, requiring excitation in the sub-THz domain. This constraint led to the development of DNP instruments by the LPMN and its collaborators and the creation the Swiss start-up Swissto12. Collaboration between the Swiss Plasma Center at EPFL and the LPMN led to the construction of a gyrotron. The laboratory further showed that this equipment can induce resonance in antiferromagnets, thus expanding the field of spintronics.

Distinctions 
 Secretary of the European Physical Society (1993-1998)
 President of the Swiss Physical Society (2002-2006)
 Fellow of the American Physical Society (2011)

Selected publications

Books

Articles

Spintronics

Nuclear magnetic resonance

References 

1957 births
Living people
20th-century Swiss physicists
21st-century Swiss physicists
Academic staff of the École Polytechnique Fédérale de Lausanne
Swiss nuclear physicists
Fellows of the American Physical Society